Air Vice-Marshal Abdul Halim Perdanakusuma (18 November 1922 – 14 December 1947), better known as Halim Perdanakusuma, was an Indonesian airman and National Hero of Indonesia.

Biography
Perdanakusuma was born in Sampang, Madura, Dutch East Indies, on 18 November 1922. After attending elementary and middle school at schools for native Indonesians, he attended the Opleidingschool voor Inlandsche Ambtenaren (a school for the training of native officials) in Magelang. However, he dropped out in his second year and joined the Naval Academy of Surabaya to answer the Dutch colonial government's call for a militia. After finishing the academy, he spent some time in the Dutch Colonial Navy's information department.

At the time of the Japanese invasion of the Indies in 1942, against which he had been trained to fight, Perdanakusuma was in Britain, training in navigation with the Royal Canadian Air Force; as part of his training, he flew on 44 missions throughout Europe, including flying Avro Lancasters in bombing missions over Nazi Germany.

After the end of World War II, Perdanakusuma returned to newly independent Indonesia.

In early 1947 Perdanakusuma was promoted to air commodore and tasked with establishing a branch of the air force in Bukittinggi, West Sumatra; to complete his task he penetrated the Dutch blockade of the island. Air Officer Iswahyudi was also tasked to assist with managing the base. At the time, the various air units in Sumatra were managed individually and under the command of the army; Perdanakusuma and Iswahyudi proceeded to unite them into their own branch.

On 17 August 1947, he led paratroops into Borneo. That December, Perdanakusuma was ordered to fly to Thailand with Iswahyudi to pick up medical supplies. On their return trip on 14 December, the Avro Anson they were flying stalled, leading it to crash outside of Tanjung Hantu, Malaysia, killing both of them. Perdanakusuma's body was originally buried in Lumut, Malaysia, but later relocated to Kalibata Heroes Cemetery in 1975.

Legacy
Perdanakusuma was declared a National Hero of Indonesia on 9 August 1975 with Presidential Decree Number 063/TK/Year 1975. With this declaration came a posthumous promotion to air vice marshal.

Halim Perdanakusuma Airport in Jakarta is named after him. Two upcoming railway stations near the airport (Halim LRT station of Greater Jakarta LRT and Halim railway station of Jakarta-Bandung high-speed rail is also named after him.

References
Footnotes

Bibliography

Victims of aviation accidents or incidents in Malaysia
1922 births
1947 deaths
Indonesian military personnel
People from Sampang Regency
National Heroes of Indonesia
Royal Air Force pilots of World War II